Saulcerīte is a Latvian feminine given name. The associated name day is December 21.

Notable people named Saulcerīte
Saulcerīte Viese (born 1932), Latvian writer and literary scholar

References 

Latvian feminine given names
Feminine given names